Sarah Gillow Marshall "Cissie" Stewart (19 July 1911 – 8 January 2008), later known by her married name Sarah Hunt, was a Scottish swimmer who competed and won a silver medal at the 1928 Summer Olympics.

Early life 
Stewart was from Dundee, the daughter of footballer William Stewart. She was a member of the Dundee Belmont Swimming Club.

Swimming career 
At the 1928 Summer Olympics in Amsterdam, Cissie Stewart won a silver medal in the women's 4×100-metre freestyle relay event and was fourth in the 400-metre freestyle event. Her Olympic teammates were Joyce Cooper, Ellen King, Jean McDowell, and Vera Tanner.

Stewart placed second in the 1929 national 440-yard freestyle championship, at Bristol. She also competed for Scotland at the 1930 British Empire Games and the 1934 British Empire Games, and won a bronze medal in the 4×100-yard freestyle relay.

Personal life 
Stewart married a journalist, Bill Hunt, in Walkerville, Ontario in 1930; she smuggled her wedding dress into her luggage for the Commonwealth Games in nearby Hamilton, and the couple eloped immediately after the event. She moved to Glasgow as a newlywed. She died at a nursing home in Troon in 2008, aged 96 years.

See also
 List of Olympic medalists in swimming (women)

References 

1911 births
2008 deaths
Sportspeople from Dundee
Scottish female swimmers
Scottish female freestyle swimmers
Olympic swimmers of Great Britain
Swimmers at the 1928 Summer Olympics
Olympic silver medallists for Great Britain
Swimmers at the 1930 British Empire Games
Commonwealth Games bronze medallists for Scotland
Scottish Olympic medallists
Medalists at the 1928 Summer Olympics
Olympic silver medalists in swimming
Commonwealth Games medallists in swimming
Medallists at the 1930 British Empire Games